Chromocyphella muscicola is a species of fungus in the family Hymenogastraceae. Basidiocarps (fruit bodies) are cyphelloid, cup-shaped, about 4 mm across, with an upper surface covered with fine hairs and a smooth underside.

It was first described as Cyphella muscicola by Elias Fries in 1822, and was transferred to the newly erected genus, Chromocyphylla, in 1959 by Marinus Anton Donk.

References 

Agaricales
Taxa named by Elias Magnus Fries
Fungi described in 1822